Pleasant Hall is an unincorporated community in Letterkenny Township in Franklin County, Pennsylvania, United States. Pleasant Hall is located at the intersection of state routes 533 and 997, north of Chambersburg and northeast of the Letterkenny Army Depot.

Pleasant Hall was platted circa 1840. A post office called Pleasant Hall has been in operation since 1851.

References

Unincorporated communities in Franklin County, Pennsylvania
Unincorporated communities in Pennsylvania